Hotel New York may refer to:

Hotels

Hotel New York (Rotterdam), a hotel in Rotterdam, the Netherlands
Disney's Hotel New York, a hotel at Disneyland Resort Paris
Hotel New York (Venice), a former hotel
New York-New York Hotel and Casino, Las Vegas

Music
Hotel New York, an album by Anouk, conceived in Rotterdam Hotel New York

See also
New York City hotels